UFC 62: Liddell vs. Sobral was a mixed martial arts event held by the Ultimate Fighting Championship on August 26, 2006.  The event took place at the Mandalay Bay Events Center in Las Vegas, Nevada and was broadcast live on pay-per-view in the United States and Canada.

The main event featured a UFC Light Heavyweight Championship between Chuck Liddell and Renato Sobral. The co-main event was a TUF rematch between Forrest Griffin and Stephan Bonnar.

Results

Bonus awards
Fight of the Night: Hermes Franca vs. Jamie Varner
Knockout of the Night: Chuck Liddell
Submission of the Night: Nick Diaz

Reported payout

Chuck Liddell: $250,000

Forrest Griffin: $32,000

Renato "Babalu" Sobral: $21,000

Nick Diaz: $20,000

Stephan Bonnar: $16,000

Cheick Kongo: $12,000

Hermes Franca: $12,000

Yushin Okami: $8,000

Josh Neer: $6,000

Rob MacDonald: $5,000

David Heath: $4,000

Eric Schafer $4,000

Wilson Gouveia: $4,000

Alan Belcher: $3,000

Christian Wellisch $3,000

Jamie Varner: $3,000

Wes Combs: $2,000

Cory Walmsley $2,000

Total Fighter Payouts: $407,000

See also
 Ultimate Fighting Championship
 List of UFC champions
 List of UFC events
 2006 in UFC

References

External links
Official UFC website
Official UFC 62 website

Ultimate Fighting Championship events
2006 in mixed martial arts
Mixed martial arts in Las Vegas
2006 in sports in Nevada